Fernando Pires may refer to:

 Fernando Pires (footballer, born 1951), Brazilian football player and coach known as Fernando
 Fernando Pires (footballer, born 1969), Portuguese football player and coach